The Dachstein Mountains are a mountain range in the Northern Limestone Alps.

The term is used by the Austrian Alpine Club in its classification of the Eastern Alps as one of the 24 sub-ranges of the Northern Limestone Alps (AVE No. 14).

The Dachstein range includes:
 The Dachstein Massif proper with its highest peak, the Hoher Dachstein
  Grimming in the east to the upper Styrian Enns valley
  Sarstein in the north at the other bank of the River Traun

Extent 
The Dachstein Mountains are bordered as follows:

 to the northeast by the Totes Gebirge, which is separated by the line from Sankt Agatha on the Hallstättersee – Pötschenhöhe – Bad Aussee – Kainischtraun – Bad Mitterndorf – Klachau – Grimmingbach to the River Enns
 to the south by the Rottenmanner und Wölzer Tauern and the Niedere Tauern, which are separated by the River Enns, roughly from Untergrimming to its confluence with the Weißenbach near Haus im Ennstal
 to the southwest by the Roßbrand in the Salzburg Slate Mountains along the line from Weißenbach – Ramsaubach – Schildlehenbach – Kalte Mandling – Warme Mandling – Marcheggsattel – Fritzbach – Linbach – Neubach  to Lungötz in the Lammer valley
 to the west the Lammer valley forms the boundary of the mountains with the Tennengebirge
 to the northwest the Salzkammergut Mountains are separated by a line from Rußbach – Gschütt Pass – Gosaubach – Hallstätter See  to Sankt Agatha

Divisions 
The two individual peaks of Grimming and Sarstein were counted as part of the Dachstein range because both have been broken off the Dachstein limestone block, even though they are quite separate from a hydrographic and orographic perspective. This classification appeared as early as 1924 in the Moriggl Division of the Alps.

The dividing lines are:
 Hallstättersee and Koppentraun to Sarstein
 from Bad Mitterndorf on the Salzabach including the Salza Reservoir to Grimming – here the Dachstein Glacier has carved out another valley which is drained by the Kainischtraun to the north and the Grimmingbach to the south, and which forms the natural landscape division with the Totes Gebirge. In between the Salza crosses the valley in a curious way, and forms a narrow gorge (Salzaschlucht) between Grimming and Kemetgebirge, the eastern edge of the Dachstein plateau.

Climate

References

External links 

 
Mountain ranges of the Alps
Northern Limestone Alps
Mountains of Salzburg (state)
Mountain ranges of Styria
Mountains of Upper Austria